Arnett Nathaniel Moultrie (born November 18, 1990) is an American professional basketball player for the Taichung Suns of the T1 League. He played college basketball with UTEP and Mississippi State.

High school
In Moultrie's junior season at Raleigh-Egypt High School, he averaged 15 points, 8 rebounds and 2 blocks per game. In his senior season, he averaged 15 points, 8 rebounds and 4 blocks per game.

College career

Freshman season
In Moultrie's freshman season at UTEP, he averaged 8.8 points and 8.2 rebounds per game. He was also named to the Conference USA All-Freshman Team. Moultrie averaged 13.2 points and 8.7 rebounds per game in the College Basketball Invitational as UTEP lost in the final round to Oregon State.

Sophomore season
In his sophomore season at UTEP, Moultrie averaged 9.8 points and 6.7 rebounds per game. In the Conference-USA Tournament, Moultrie averaged 12.0 points per game and earned a spot on the all-tournament team.

Junior season
Moultrie was forced to sit out a season after transferring to Mississippi State. In his first and only season playing for Mississippi State, (2011–12), Moultrie averaged 16.4 points and 10.5 rebounds per game. He was also named to the All-SEC men's basketball team. On March 28, 2012, Moultrie decided to enter his name in the 2012 NBA Draft.

Professional career
Moultrie was drafted with the 27th pick in the 2012 NBA draft by the Miami Heat. He was then traded to the Philadelphia 76ers for Justin Hamilton and a future first-round draft pick. On December 21, 2012, Moultrie was assigned to the Sioux Falls Skyforce of the NBA D-League. He was recalled on January 6, 2013.

On February 4, 2014, he was assigned to the Delaware 87ers. On February 9, 2014, he was recalled by the 76ers. On February 21, 2014, Moultrie had his first career start. In 31 minutes, he recorded 6 points, 5 rebounds and 2 steals in a 112-124 loss to the Dallas Mavericks. On March 15, 2014, he was reassigned to the 87ers. On March 31, 2014, he was suspended for five games for violating the NBA's anti-drug policy. On April 6, 2014, he was again recalled to the 76ers.

On October 27, 2014, he was traded to the New York Knicks in exchange for Travis Outlaw, a 2019 second-round draft selection and the option exchange 2018 second-round draft selections. Upon acquisition, he was waived by the Knicks.

On December 16, 2014, he signed with the Jiangsu Dragons of the Chinese Basketball Association.

On December 5, 2015, Moultrie signed with Al-Riyadi Beirut of Lebanon.

In March 2018, Moultrie signed with the NLEX Road Warriors of the Philippine Basketball Association as their import for the 2018 PBA Commissioner's Cup.

In November 2018, Moultrie signed with Kalev/Cramo of the Latvian–Estonian Basketball League (LEBL) and the VTB United League. His first game for the team was in the VTB United League as he scored 16 points and grabbed 9 rebounds in 26 minutes against Parma as Kalev/Cramo won 93–82.

In December 2019, Arnett moved to the Beijing Royal Fighters of the Chinese Basketball Association. He debuted on 5 January 2020, as club won 112–96 against Shanghai Sharks. Moultrie averaged 18.8 points and 11.3 rebounds per game. On October 29, 2020, he signed with the Nanjing Monkey Kings. On March 28, 2021, Moultrie scored 37 points and grabbed a career-high 34 rebounds in a 105-95 victory over the Jiangsu Dragons. His 34 rebounds were five rebounds short of breaking the CBA record for most rebounds in a single game.

On March 8, 2023, Taichung Suns registered Arnett as import player. On March 9, Arnett signed with the Taichung Suns of the T1 League.

Career statistics

NBA statistics

Regular season 

|-
| align="left" | 
| align="left" | Philadelphia
| 47 || 0 || 11.5 || .582 || .000 || .643 || 3.1 || 0.2 || 0.4 || 0.2 || 3.7
|-
| align="left" | 
| align="left" | Philadelphia
| 12 || 2 || 15.6 || .421 || .000 || .800 || 2.9 || 0.2 || 0.7 || 0.3 || 3.0
|-
| align="center" colspan="2" | Career
| 59 || 2 || 12.4 || .547 || .000 || .667 || 3.1 || 0.2 || 0.4 || 0.2 || 3.6
|-

College statistics

|-
|style="text-align:left;"|2008–09
|style="text-align:left;"|UTEP
|37||34||26.8||.502||.282||.535||8.2||0.6||0.8||0.9||8.8
|-
|style="text-align:left;"|2009–10
|style="text-align:left;"|UTEP
|33||33||28.9||.475||.225||.651||8.2||1.2||1.4||0.8||9.8
|-
|style="text-align:left;"|2011–12
|style="text-align:left;"|Mississippi State
|30||30||35.8||.549||.444||.780||10.5||1.2||0.8||0.8||16.4
|}

CBA statistics 

|-
| align="left" | 2020-21
| align="left" | Nanjing
| 48 || 45 || 36.7 || .576 || .300 || .818 || 13.0 || 2.7 || 1.5 || 1.2 || 26.3
|-
| align="left" | 2021-22
| align="left" | Xinjiang
| 25 || 25 || 41.3 || .648 || .000 || .865 || 14.8 || 3.0 || 2.1 || 1.4 || 29.6
|}
Source: basketball-stats.de (Date: 26. March 2022)

International career
Moultrie represented the U-19 United States national team at the 2009 U-19 World Championship held in New Zealand, where they won the gold medal.

References

External links
 

1990 births
Living people
American expatriate basketball people in China
American expatriate basketball people in Estonia
American expatriate basketball people in Iran
American expatriate basketball people in Lebanon
American expatriate basketball people in the Philippines
American expatriate basketball people in Russia
American expatriate basketball people in South Korea
American expatriate basketball people in Turkey
American expatriate basketball people in Uruguay
American men's basketball players
Basketball players from New York City
Basketball players from Memphis, Tennessee
BC Kalev/Cramo players
Delaware 87ers players
Daegu KOGAS Pegasus players
Jiangsu Dragons players
Korvpalli Meistriliiga players
Mahram Tehran BC players
Miami Heat draft picks
Mississippi State Bulldogs men's basketball players
NLEX Road Warriors players
Parma Basket players
Philadelphia 76ers players
Philippine Basketball Association imports
Power forwards (basketball)
Sioux Falls Skyforce players
Sportspeople from Queens, New York
UTEP Miners men's basketball players
Al Riyadi Club Beirut basketball players
Beijing Royal Fighters players
Nanjing Tongxi Monkey Kings players
Xinjiang Flying Tigers players
Taichung Suns players
T1 League imports